For the results of the Ecuador national football team, see:
 Ecuador national football team results (1938–1979)
 Ecuador national football team results (1980–1999)
 Ecuador national football team results (2000–2019)
 Ecuador national football team results (2020–present)